Mesquite is a former town in Borden County, Texas, United States. From its inception, Mesquite remained a rural farming community. A school, established in 1905, served the area until 1952, after which the building appears to have been abandoned. Today, all that remains at the site of Mesquite are a Church of Christ, several scattered houses, and the abandoned schoolhouse.
The rest of the town appears to have been subsumed by private farms for cropland.

Geography
Mesquite is located on Farm to Market 1054, east of US Route 87 and north of US Route 180.

See also
List of ghost towns in Texas
Close City, Texas
Canyon Valley, Texas
Rath City, Texas
West Texas

References

External links 

Geography of Borden County, Texas
Ghost towns in the Texas South Plains